was an important figure in the field of Japanese language studies and Sinology. He is best known as chief editor of the Dai Kan-Wa jiten, a comprehensive dictionary of Chinese characters, or kanji.

Biography 
Morohashi's father was also a scholar of Chinese and was a lover of the poetry of Su Shi.  His name, Tetsuji, is derived from the name of Su Shi's brother Zhe (轍) and the suffix "ji".

 (Great Chinese-Japanese Dictionary) Morohashi Tetsuji, ed. Tōkyō: Taishūkan shoten 大修館書店 .
 1943: Vol. I
 1955-1960: Vol. I revised & Vols. II-XIII.

The  is located in his hometown of Sanjō, Niigata, which is also known as the Kangaku no sato ( "Home of Chinese Studies").

Honors

Morohashi was honored for contributions to sinology and lexicography.
 Order of the Chrysanthemum (1957)
 Order of Culture (1965)

References

External links
  Tetsuji Morohashi Memorial Museum - Sanjo City
   - Sanjo City

Japanese lexicographers
1883 births
1982 deaths
People from Niigata Prefecture
Japanese sinologists
Japanese orientalists
Recipients of the Order of Culture
20th-century lexicographers